Benjamin William Lammers (born November 12, 1995) is an American professional basketball player for Alba Berlin of the Basketball Bundesliga. He played college basketball at Georgia Tech.

College career
 
Lammers came to Georgia Tech from Alamo Heights High School in San Antonio, Texas, earning All-State honors in each of his last three seasons. He chose the Yellow Jackets over Texas A&M, Miami, Marquette and Stanford. Lammers chose Georgia Tech in part for its excellence in mechanical engineering. On the court, Lammers' basketball career started slowly. He was a reserve for his first two college seasons. But as a junior, under new Georgia Tech coach Josh Pastner, he became one of the most improved players of the 2016–17 season. After averaging 14.2 points, 9.2 rebounds and 3.2 blocks per game, Lammers was named second-team All-Atlantic Coast Conference and the ACC Defensive Player of the Year in 2017. Lammers' improved play and stellar defense were primary reasons that the Yellow Jackets performed above preseason expectations, making it to the championship game of the 2017 National Invitation Tournament.

Professional career
Lammers attended the minicamp with the Charlotte Hornets but was cut prior to Summer League play. On August 22, 2018, Lammers signed with RETAbet Bilbao Basket of the LEB Oro. In his first season in Spain, Lammers averaged 10.1 points, 6.6 rebounds and 2.1 blocks per game in LEB Oro, helping team to a second place finish and promotion to Liga ACB. Lammers averaged 7.8 points, 4.8 rebounds and 1.9 blocks per game during the 2019-20 season in Liga ACB. He signed a three-year deal with Alba Berlin on July 10, 2020.

References

External links

Georgia Tech Yellow Jackets bio

1995 births
Living people
Alamo Heights High School alumni
Alba Berlin players
American expatriate basketball people in Germany
American expatriate basketball people in Spain
American men's basketball players
Basketball players from Houston
Bilbao Basket players
Centers (basketball)
Georgia Tech Yellow Jackets men's basketball players
Liga ACB players
Basketball players from San Antonio